Yizhen may refer to:
Yizhen, the main setting of Born Red
Yizheng

Yi Zhen Lin is an eye dot